The Sanna is a tributary of the Vistula in Poland. Its source is in the village of Wierzchowiska II in Lublin Voivodeship, Galicia. It flows westward through a rural area. Then, it turns northward for a few kilometers until flowing into the Vistula near the city of Annopol. It is about 50 km long.

References
 Rzeka Sanna 

Rivers of Poland
Rivers of Lublin Voivodeship